Cass Street Bridge may refer to:
Cass Street Bridge (Joliet, Illinois)
Cass Street Bridge (La Crosse, Wisconsin)
Cass Street Bridge (Tampa, Florida)